Jacob of Tsurtavi also known as Jacob the Priest (იაკობ ხუცესი, Iakob Khutsesi) was the 5th-century Georgian religious writer and priest from Tsurtavi, then the major town of Gogarene and the Lower Iberia. 

A personal priest of Saint Shushanik and an eyewitness of her martyrdom at the hand of her spouse, bidaxae Varsken, Jacob compiled her life in his hagiographic novel the Martyrdom of the Holy Queen Shushanik, the oldest surviving work of the Georgian literature written between 476 and 483. Except for scarce information obtained from his work, nothing more is known about Jacob’s life.

See also 

List of Georgian writers

References 

მ. საბინინი, საქართველოს სამოთხე,  გვ. 182-192;
იაკობ ცურტაველი, მარტვილობაÁ შუშანიკისი, ქართული და სომხური ტექსტები გამოსცა ილ. აბულაძემ, ტფილისი, 1938, გვ. 3-47;
ს. ყუბანეიშვილი, ძველი ქართული ლიტერატურის ქრესტომათია, I, თბილისი, 1946, გვ. 34-44;
ძველი ქართული აგიოგრაფიული ლიტერატურის ძეგლები, I, გვ. 11-29;
იაკობ ცურტაველი, წამებაÁ წმიდისა შუშანიკისი დედოფლისაÁ, გამოსაცემად მოამზადა ც. ქურციკიძემ, თბილისი, 1979.
К. Кекелидзе,Памятники древнегрузинской агиографии, Тбилиси, 1956, გვ. 7-28.
К. Кекелидзе, Якоб Цуртавели, Мученичество Шушаники, Тбилиси, 1979;
Яков Цуртавели, Мученичество Шушаник, перевод В. Дондуа, Введение и примечания З. Алексидзе, Тбилиси, 1978.
ა. ბარამიძე, `შუშანიკის წამების~ ახლებური გაგების გარშემო, ჟურნ. მნათობი, # 10, 1978.
რ. ბარამიძე, ქართული მწერლობის სათავეებთან, თბილისი, 1978;
კ. კეკელიძე, ძველი ქართული ლიტერატურის ისტორია, გვ. 113-122;
ქართული მწერლობა, I, თბილისი, 1984, გვ. 124-127;
შ. ონიანი, იაკობ ხუცესის `წამებაÁ წმიდისა შუშანიკისი~, თბილისი, 1978;
შუშანიკის წამება. საიუბილეო კრებული. გამოკვლევები და წერილები, თბილისი, 1978;
თ. ჭილაძე, იაკობ ცურტაველის `შუშანიკის წამება~, თბილისი, 1978;
ივ. ჯავახიშვილი, საისტორიო მწერლობა, გვ. 45-54;
ნ. ჯანაშია, შუშანიკის წამება, ისტორიულ-წყაროთმცოდნეობითი გამოკვლევა, თბილისი, 1980;
შ. ონიანი, იაკობ ხუცესის `შუშანიკის წამება”, თბილისი, 1978.
Bart D Ehrman, Andrew Jacobs, editors, Christianity in Late Antiquity, 300-450 C.E: A Reader, Oxford University Press US,  pages 499-504  
Donald Rayfield, The Literature of Georgia: A History, Routledge (UK)  page 42

Male writers from Georgia (country)
5th-century writers
Christian hagiographers
5th-century Christian clergy